Kavadukudi  is a village in the  
Avadaiyarkoil revenue block of Pudukkottai district, Tamil Nadu, India.

Demographics 

As per the 2001 census, Kavadukudi had a total population of  283 with 130 males and 153 females. Out of the total population 182 people were literate.

References

Villages in Pudukkottai district